Wayne "Buddy" Van Horn (August 20, 1928 – May 11, 2021) was an American stunt coordinator and film director. He directed the Clint Eastwood films Any Which Way You Can (1980), The Dead Pool (1988), and Pink Cadillac (1989). A long-time stunt double for Eastwood, he was credited as the stunt coordinator on Eastwood's films from 1972 to 2011, and as second unit director on Magnum Force (1973) and The Rookie (1990). He was sometimes credited as Wayne Van Horn in the 1980s. He earlier doubled for Guy Williams on Disney's Zorro, and Gregory Peck. Van Horn's most prominent onscreen appearance is the role of Marshal Jim Duncan in the Eastwood film High Plains Drifter (1973). Van Horn died in Los Angeles on May 11, 2021, at the age of 92.

Filmography

Director
 Any Which Way You Can (1980)
 The Dead Pool (1988)
 Pink Cadillac (1989)

Second Unit Director
 Magnum Force (1973) - Also Uncredited Stunt Performer
 The Rookie (1990) - Also Stunt Performer
 Outbreak (1995) - Also Stunt Coordinator
 Absolute Power (1997) - Uncredited/Also Stunt Coordinator

Actor

References

External links
 
 Obituary
 

1928 births
2021 deaths
American film directors
American people of Dutch descent
American stunt performers
Film people from Los Angeles